Vives En Mí is the fourth studio album by Panamian singer-songwriter Flex. It was released on August 21, 2012 through EMI Latin. Their first single is titled No Hay Nadie Más and was released on May 18, 2012.

Track list

Standard Edition
 "Vives en Mí" – 3:28
 "Alegras Mi Vida" (featuring Farruko) – 4:10
 "Me Enamoré" – 3:30
 "Te Invito al Woi" (featuring Mr. Phillips) – 3:37
 "La Niña de Mis Sueños" (featuring Alex Pro) – 2:44
 "Dance With You" – 3:39
 "Solo Tú" – 3:23
 "Bonita" (featuring Fanny Lu) – 4:18
 "Yo Te Amaré" – 3:22 
 "No Hay Nadie Más" – 3:50

iTunes Bonus Track
This song is only available on iTunes, it is not included in the physical CD

 "Dile Amor" — 2:55

References

External links
Official website

2012 albums
Flex (singer) albums
Spanish-language albums
EMI Records albums